Yin Chang or In-ch'ang (1859 –1928 or 1934) was a military official, ambassador to Germany, and educational reformer in the Qing Dynasty and the Republic of China. He was appointed the nation's first Minister of War in the late Qing Dynasty. During the Republic he served as the military Chief of Staff for all of the subsequent presidents in the Beiyang Government. He was ethnic Manchu, and his family belonged to the Plain White Banner Clan of the Manchu Military Organization (滿洲正白旗); he held the title of Prince of the Plain White Banner Clan; at court he was addressed as Wu-lou (五/午楼).

Biography

In the Qing Dynasty 
Originally Yin Chang was a student of the Guozijian, and by 1872 he was studying German at the Tongwen Guan, Beijing. In 1877 he was sent to Germany as an attaché to the recently established Chinese Embassy in Berlin which had offices in Vienna and Amsterdam. On his arrival in Berlin he was not fluent with spoken German and changed from 3rd to 4thclass translator. However, he quickly compensated for any deficiency by mastering High German, the Berlin manner of speech, as well as the vernacular of the Imperial Grenadiers. Georg von der Gabelentz, the founding father of German Sinology, in the introduction of his 1883 publication “Chinesische Grammatik” acknowledged his friendship with Yin Chang praising his work in reviewing the book’s manuscripts and command of German grammar. While in Berlin Yin Chang married a German woman, with whom he had a daughter.

In 1879 Yin Chang enrolled in the Royal Prussian Military Academy in Grosz-Lichterfelde (Preußische Hauptkadettenanstalt) for four years. He studied military science at the same time as fellow student Crown Prince Wilhelm II. His studies would have a formative influence, decisive for his later career. During this time he was first introduced to the Krupp family, producers of ammunition and armament, and cultivated a friendship with them. To further his military training, Yin Chang was sent as a Lieutenant to the 84thAustrian Infantry Regiment stationed in Vienna under the command of Baron von Bauer in 1883. He became an enthusiastic adherent of the Viennese way of life.

Yin Chang was recalled to China in 1884 and initially assigned to the Tientsin Naval Academy; however in December he was summoned to Beijing to serve as translator for the German military envoy to the Emperor. By June 1885 Yin Chang was appointed an instructor in military science at the Tientsin Military Academy (天津武備學堂), where he introduced German officers to teach the study and practice of German military techniques. The following year he was promoted to superintendent of the Academy. The future President of the Republic of China, Feng Guozhang, was a student under his direction.

After the first Sino-Japanese War (1884-1885) Germany entered the negotiations of the Treaty of Shimonoseki, and used the assassination of two German missionaries to claim the Concession of Kiaochow Bay (Jiaoxian) in Shandong Province. In 1898, Prince Heinrich of Prussia, with his East Asia Naval Squadron, sailed into Tientsin. Yin Chang was summoned to negotiate German claims on the region of Kiaochow Bay and the port of Tsingtao. Yin Chang turned Prince Heinrich’s mission into a diplomatic rather than military success, by making him the first foreign potentate to be received by the Imperial Court. In the winter of 1899, Yin Chang headed the negotiations with Germany for railway and mining rights in Shandong (山東路礦章程) province, and the concession in Tsingtao. His negotiations became part of the Boxer Protocol, signed on September 7, 1901 in Beijing. Subsequently these terms were integrated into the Tientsin Protocol, which in 1918 became part of the peace treaty with Germany that ended World War I.

It is said that during the Boxer Rebellion, when the troops of the Eight-Nation Alliance stormed Beijing to relieve the besieged Legations, Yin Chang, with his German-equipped soldiers, escorted the Emperor Guangxu and the Empress Dowager Cixi to safe passage through the back gates of the Forbidden City into the safety of Shaanxi Province, where the foreigners could not reach them.

In 1901 Yin Chang was named Lieutenant-General of the Plain White Banner Garrison  (正白旗漢軍副都統) That August 1901 he was appointed the Chinese Ambassador to Germany (Berlin). Additionally, in September 1901, by Imperial Edict, Yin Chang was charged with accompanying Zaifeng, Prince Chun to Germany with the special mission to convey China's regret to Kaiser Wilhelm II for the murder of Baron Clemens von Ketteler during the Boxer Rebellion. The mission proved an unexpected success, with Prince Chun, the first member of the Imperial family to venture outside China, eagerly awaited by curious, enthusiastic crowds. After some negotiation the Kaiser accorded Prince Chun a splendid reception and delighted with the young prince, invited him to review the military maneuvers of 50,000 troops in Danzig. The international press covered his every step and his popularity created some anxiety in the Empress Dowager causing her to curtail the rest of his European tour.

As ambassador Yin Chang was a polyglot, brought up in Manchu and Chinese (Mandarin), and in addition to his mastery of German, he knew French, the diplomatic language, and English. The Kaiser and his court were charmed by his command of the Berlin dialect making him a popular figure. During Ambassador Yin Chang's time in Germany, it has been noted in Ambassadorial reports that he was the Kaiser's occasional drinking companion. Kaiser Wilhelm II was interested in the problems of modernizing a country’s military forces. The Kaiser taught Yin Chang much about the organization, training, discipline, and the equipment of a modern army. Also during this time, Yin Chang was asked to step in as ambassador to the Netherlands for a term. Back in Germany he arranged a state visit to China for Prince Adalbert of Prussia the third son of Kaiser Wilhelm II.

In 1905 he was recalled to China and appointed the director of the Nobles' College (貴冑學堂總辦) in Beijing. Since Yin Chang had cut his hair, he attached a wig braid to his official hat worn during his frequent summons at court, much to the disapproval of the old bureaucrats.  He began his campaign for modernization first by changing the traditional uniforms of the Chinese Army to uniforms modeled on those of the German Army. For equipment, he ordered arms and ammunition from Krupp. Yin Chang was a leading advocate for the abolition of the Imperial Examination, which he thought was essential to the modernization of China. Most importantly, this had far-reaching effects; supplanting the Confucian classics opened the curriculum to all the modern disciplines of the sciences and humanities. Instead of social advancement solely through civil service appointments, now students could pursue their own interests and prepare for a profession, including the military.

In September 1906 Yin Chang became Commander-in-Chief in Jiangbei (江北提督), and two months later, became Army Chief of Staff (陸軍部右侍郎). By September 1908 he was reappointed as Chinese Ambassador to Germany, but because of the autumn military maneuvers in Anhwei (Anhui) he delayed his departure. Then the sudden death of the Emperor Guangxu on November 14, followed by the death of the Dowager Empress Cixi on the 15th, and the subsequent investiture of Zaifeng, Prince Qing as Regent, Yin Chang could not proceed to his post until Spring 1909. The Prince Regent, Zaifeng wanted to execute Yuan Shih Kai for his betrayal of his brother the Emperor Guangxu and the 100 Days Reform. Yin Chang pleaded on Yuan Shih Kai's behalf and Prince Zaifeng commuted his sentence which was to be exile from Beijing. On his arrival in Berlin with his wife and entourage, Yin Chang, in General’s dress, with monocle and sword, was met by the press as a social notable and ladies’ man. In 1910 Yin Chang was recalled to China to take up the position of acting President of the Board of War (陸軍部尚書). Reluctant to leave his work in Germany, Yin Chang remarked, “I do not think that our country is yet sufficiently far advanced for a man to be able to achieve great results in a short space of time. I do not look upon my appointment either as an enviable one or one in which I am likely to be able to achieve any very striking results.”

In the Xinhai Revolution and the Beiyang Government 

In September 1910 Yin Chang became the Chief of Staff of all the Army divisions stationed in the vicinity of Beijing (訓練近畿陸軍各鎮大臣). Three months later, Yin Chang was appointed the first Minister of War in Prince Qing's Cabinet and he consolidated the different branches of the military under his aegis. As Minister of War Yin Chang set out to achieve three objectives: 1) greater efficiency and economy in his ministry; 2) improvement to the military profession; 3) establishing a national chain of command for the military under the ministry. To instill a sense of professionalism he ordered all officers to wear uniforms at work and to use military salutes on all occasions, official and civil. He succeeded in fostering a sense of patriotism throughout the Army as evidenced by a new respect and pride in the military profession. As the first Minister of War, Yin Chang was dedicated to educating the population of the country with general information about the military and the function and responsibilities of the army. He wanted to create a sense of patriotism by making the military a subject in schools, and the Imperial University added a military course to the curriculum. He required military drills and instruction as well as physical education included in the curriculum of middle and primary schools. Yin Chang’s efforts at reform encountered opposition from traditionalists, officials protecting their interests and sinecures, and provincial governments guarding their power. The Manchu Dynasty fell before the results of his work became evident. Different aspects of it were taken up by succeeding regimes for their own purposes.

In May 1911 Yin Chang attained the rank of full general but also remained in the Cabinet. On the outbreak of the Xinhai Revolution in August of that year, General Yin Chang was appointed Commander-in-Chief of the Imperial forces and sent to quell the revolutionary army in Hubei. However, as soon as he reached the front, his command of the army of the Qing Dynasty was countermanded by Prime Minister Yuan Shi Kai (Chinese vs Manchu), thus leaving vital weapons and ammunition factories unprotected. It extinguished all hopes of a constitutional monarchy. On his return to Beijing he was appointed Chief of the General Staff but resigned from his post as Yuan Shih Kai established his Cabinet. It has been speculated that had Marshal Yin Chang been allowed to remain in Hubei, the revolution might not have been a success. When the monarchy was abolished on Feb. 12, 1912, with the abdication of the Emperor, Yin Chang resigned his post in the cabinet marking the Day of the Princes: one Mongol and eight Manchu princes collectively resigned.

With the establishment of the Republic of China, on March 10, 1912 when Yuan Shih Kai became the interim President in Beijing, the Beiyang government appointed Yin Chang as  High Diplomatic Advisor in the Ministry of Foreign Affairs. He also took on the responsibility of special envoy between the small court at the palace and the Beiyang Republic.  In December 1912 Yin Chang was reinstated a full general while also serving as Military Chief of Staff to President Yuan Shih Kai (總統府軍事處處長). Yin Chang, following the cautionary example of other officials of the Empire, felt the need to purchase property in German controlled Tsingtau (Qingdao) in 1913. When the Senate was established for the Republic in May 1914, Yin Chang became one of two national representatives of the Manchus. The following January 13, 1915, the first members of the Senate were sworn in at Guanyue Temple by Yin Chang who officiated the oath of office ceremony on behalf of President Yuan Shih Kai. In May 1915, Yuan Shih Kai abandoned the national anthem promulgated by Sun Yat-Sen, and launched a new national anthem for the Republic of China, “China stands heroically in the universe….”(1915-1921) the lyrics by general Yin Chang, music by Wang Lu. In these years, Yuan Shih Kai bestowed his seventh daughter, the beautiful Yuan-Fu Zhen, on Yin Chang’s son, Yin Tie-Ge also known as Yin Chang, thus forming an alliance.  When despite all of Yin Chang’s efforts to dissuade him, Yuan Shih Kai declared himself Emperor in August 1915, he resigned from the government. After Yuan Shih Kai’s death the following June 1916, Yin Chang was recalled to his position as military chief of Staff under President Li Yuanhong.

When on the morning of July 1, 1917, the royalist general Zhang Xun’s army entered Beijing and proclaimed the restoration of Pu Yi as Emperor of China, Yin Chang resigned from the Republic and entered the Forbidden City to become Commander of the Imperial Guard. After ten days when this restoration failed, leaving Yin Chang with no alternative, he attempted suicide. Officially he remained the chief military advisor, and resuming his duties in October, he was awarded a first class golden medal.

By December 1917, Yin Chang was reinstated Chief of the General Staff for the Republic. In January 1919 he was reappointed to Military Chief of Staff to the President by Xu Shichang, a position he held for succeeding presidents Li Yuanhong, Feng Kuo-chang (Feng Guozhang), and Hsu Shih-chang (Xu Shichang).

In 1922 on the 21st of October, Yin Chang, representing the Republic, attended Emperor Pu Yi's wedding to Princess Wanrong of Gobulo House of the Plain White Banner Clan. In January 1923 the Manchu court had its last great celebration in The Forbidden City. Yin Chang was commissioned to publicly convey the official congratulations of the Republic to the Emperor and present him with the special gift of President Li Yuanhong (1864-1928). Yin Chang concluded saying, “What just happened was done on behalf of the Republic, now I will pay homage to the Emperor personally,” and carried out the traditional kowtow. His involvement in Republican service did not negate the fact that Yin Chang never broke with the old dynasty.

In the last years of his life he served as Military Adviser to Generalissimo Chiang Kai-shek. In October 1923 he was awarded the title of Marshal with "Zhuang Wei" (莊威將). He died in Beijing in 1928 or 1934.

Awards and honours 
 Order of the Double Dragon (China)

References

General sources 
Seuberlich, Wolfgang. “Yin-Ch’ang Notes on a Manchu General and Diplomat of the Transitional Period" Lydia Brüll & Ulrich Kemper (Eds.) «Asien. Tradition und Fortschrift. Festschrift für Horst Hammitzsch zu seinem 60. Geburtstag», Harrassowitz Verlag, Wiesbaden, 1971, pp. 569 - 583.

Who's Who in China 3rd ed. The China Weekly Review (Shanghai), 1925.
·Yin Chang, “The Awakening of China”, trans. unknown, The Dresden Daily(English Language Daily), No. 88, Saturday, May 19, 1906.
Hauptmann Friedrich Heyer von Rosenfeld Archives, Berlin State Library, Prussian Cultural Heritage.

Qing dynasty politicians
Qing dynasty diplomats
Qing dynasty generals
Republic of China Army generals
People of the 1911 Revolution
Politicians of the Republic of China
1859 births
1928 deaths
Manchu politicians
Manchu Plain White Bannermen
Ambassadors of China to Germany
Ambassadors of China to the Netherlands